Louisa Ruth Herbert (1831 – 1921) was a well-known Victorian-era English stage actress and model for the artist Dante Gabriel Rossetti.

Actress
She was the daughter of a West Country brass founder. She was also known as Mrs. Crabbe, having married Edward Crabb, a share and stock dealer, which gave her a certain measure of respectability generally lacking in actresses in the Victorian era. By the mid-1850s, she was no longer living with her husband. She embellished the surname Crabb with a final "e" but used her maiden name as a stage name.

She had performed at the Theatre Royal, Glasgow in 1855 before she made her London stage debut on 15 October 1855 at the lower-class Royal Strand Theatre. She also acted at the Olympic Theatre before moving on to St. James's Theatre, London.

Her early roles were in comedy and burlesque productions and she drew eyes with her beauty. She drew favorable reviews with her performance as the lead in Tom Taylor's Retribution at the Olympic. One of her well-known roles was the lead in an 1863 stage production of the sensation novel Lady Audley's Secret at St. James's Theatre. Author Mary Elizabeth Braddon said Herbert gave her favorite performance as Lady Audley.

She later managed the St. James's Theatre, London from 1864 to 1868. She hired the then little-known Henry Irving as her leading man and assistant stage manager at the theatre.  One of the plays that she commissioned there was W. S. Gilbert's first successful solo play, Dulcamara, or the Little Duck and the Great Quack (1866).

Artist's model
 She first posed for Rossetti's painting 1858 painting Mary Magdalen at the Door of Simon the Pharisee. Rossetti called her a "stunner," one of the beautiful women he sought out as models for his art. As he was waiting for her to arrive, he wrote his friend William Bell Scott of his enthusiasm for her: 

Herbert went on to sit often for Rossetti in 1858 and 1859. Rossetti and Herbert did not stay in regular contact past 1860, though he based a future work on the drawing and painting he had done of her previously.

Herbert bequeathed several of the drawings made of her by Rossetti to her son, Major A.B. Crabbe, and they were sold at auction at Christie's in 1922.

Later life
Herbert later married again and published a cookbook called The St. James's Cookery Book in 1894 under her married name, Louisa Rochfort.

Notes

References
Haskins, Susan (1993). Mary Magdalen. Konecky and Konecky. .
Surtees, Virginia (1973). "Beauty and the Bird: a new Rossetti Drawing" in The Burlington Magazine.

External links

Rossetti Archive
Photographies in Bridgeman Art Library:  

1831 births
1921 deaths
19th-century British actresses
British stage actresses
English stage actresses
English artists' models
Pre-Raphaelite Brotherhood artists' models
Women of the Victorian era